This is a list of beaches in Brazil.

Alagoas

 Jatiúca
 Pajuçara
 Ponta Verde
 Praia do Gunga

Amapá
 Fazendinha

Bahia
 Itacarezinho
 Mangue Seco
 Porto da Barra
 Praia do Forte

Ceará

 Canoa Quebrada
 Jericoacoara
 Praia de Iracema

Espírito Santo
 Barra Seca

Pará

 Alter do Chão
 Mosqueiro

Paraíba
 Tambaba

Pernambuco

 Boa Viagem
 Fernando de Noronha
 Ilha de Itamaracá
 Porto de Galinhas

Rio de Janeiro

Rio de Janeiro City

 Arpoador
 Barra da Tijuca
 Botafogo
 Copacabana
 Flamengo
 Gavea
 Ipanema
 Leblon
 Leme
 São Conrado
 Urca
 Vermelha
 Vidigal

Niterói

 Camboinhas
 Charitas
 Gragoatá
 Icaraí
 Itacoatiara
 Itaipu
 Jurujuba
 Piratininga
 São Francisco

Other cities
 Angra dos Reis
 Búzios
 Cabo Frio
 Paraty
 Trindade

Rio Grande do Norte

 Genipabu
 Maracajaú
 Pipa
 Ponta Negra
 Redinha

Rio Grande do Sul
 Barra do Chuí
 Praia da Guarita
 Praia do Cassino

Santa Catarina

Florianópolis  

 Barra da Lagoa
 Campeche
 Canasvieiras
 Jurerê
 Mole
 Mozambique
 Praia Brava
 Praia de Naufragados
 Praia do Ervino
 Praia dos Açores
 Praia dos Ingleses
 Santo Antônio de Lisboa

Other cities
 Itapirubá

São Paulo

São Sebastião

 Barequeçaba
 Boiçucanga
 Juqueí
 Maresias
 Toque-Toque Grande
 Toque-Toque Pequeno

Other cities
 Guarujá
 Ilhabela
 Ilha Comprida
 Praia Grande
 Santos
 Ubatuba

See also
 List of beaches
 List of beaches in Pernambuco, a state of Brazil
 List of beaches in Rio Grande do Norte, a state of Brazil

References

 20 Top beaches in Brazil